Ghayl Ba Wazir District is a district of the Hadhramaut Governorate, Yemen. As of 2003, the district had a population of 48,831 people.

References 

Districts of Hadhramaut Governorate